The 1913 Oklahoma Sooners football team represented the University of Oklahoma as an independent during the 1913 college football season. In their eighth year under head coach Bennie Owen, the Sooners compiled a 6–2 record, and outscored their opponents by a combined total of 323 to 44.

One Sooner was recognized as an All-American: Claude Reeds, the first All-American from the program.

Schedule

References

Oklahoma
Oklahoma Sooners football seasons
Oklahoma Sooners football